In the performing arts, front of house (FOH) is the part of a performance venue that is open to the public. In theatres and live music venues, it consists of the auditorium and foyers, as opposed to the stage and backstage areas. In a theatre, the front of house manager is responsible for welcoming guests, refreshments, and making sure the auditorium is set out properly. By contrast, back of house (BOH) refers to any operations that are not visible to the audience, such as props management, costume design, stage set fabrication, lighting control, and other support functions.

Both terms are also used in the restaurant, hospitality, and retailing industries. "Back of house" refers to any work operations that do not have direct customer contact. Examples include cooking, dishwashing, cleaning, shipping and receiving, maintenance and repairs, accounting, and other indirect support tasks which are not usually visible to customers.

Live venues 
Sound operators, excluding the monitor engineers, are normally positioned in a small sectioned-off area front-of-house, surrounded by the audience or at the edge of the audience area. From this position they have unobstructed listening and a clear view of the performance, enabling the operation of the main speaker system, show control consoles and other equipment. In this case "front of house" can refer to both the general audience/public area or to the specific small section from where the show is mixed.

The front of house speakers are the main speakers that cover the audience, and the front of house desk is the desk that generates the front of house audio mix. In smaller venues the front of house desk may also produce foldback (monitor) mixes for the monitor speakers onstage, whereas in larger venues there will normally be a second mixing desk for monitor control positioned just off the side of the main stage. The audio engineer that designs the front of house sound system and puts it into place for the show/event is the system engineer, and this role is often separate from the person who operates the mixing desk who is often employed by the band directly on larger tours or employed by the venue for smaller tours. The touring engineer is usually assisted by a house sound engineer (employed by the venue) who will be familiar with the installed system of the venue.

In stage lighting, any lighting fixtures that are on the audience side of the proscenium arch are referred to as being FOH. The lighting operator may also be located in the audience area as well, but are often in a lighting booth. 

This term can also refer to the individuals whose primary work is dealing with patrons, including house managers, ticket vendors, bartenders, merchandise vendors, ushers, and museum attendants.

See also
Front office – a similar concept in the hospitality and office management industries.
Live sound mixing

References

Audio engineering
Parts of a theatre
Stage terminology
Theatrical occupations
Business terms